David Michael Kurten (born 22 March 1971) is a British politician who has served as leader of the Heritage Party since September 2020. He previously was a member of the London Assembly (AM) for Londonwide from 2016 to 2021. Elected as a UK Independence Party (UKIP) candidate, he subsequently left the party in January 2020. He is the registered leader of the Heritage Party and characterises himself as a social conservative.

Early life and career
David Michael Kurten was born in Littlehampton in Sussex on 22 March 1971 to parents Reginald Kurten and Patricia Kurten. The son of a British mother and Jamaican father, Kurten was raised by his single mother and his maternal grandparents in Sussex. He studied chemistry at the University of St Andrews, graduating BSc in 1993, before completing a PGCE at the University of Bath in 1995 and graduating MRes in chemistry at the University of Southampton in 1998.

Between 1995 and 2016 he taught chemistry at schools in the UK, Botswana, Bosnia and Herzegovina, Bermuda, and the United States.

Political career

UK Independence Party
At the 2015 general election, Kurten stood for the UK Independence Party (UKIP) in Camberwell and Peckham, coming fifth with 4.7% of the vote. He was second in the UKIP London-wide list in the 2016 London Assembly election and was elected to the London Assembly alongside Peter Whittle, with the party getting 171,069 votes. In October 2016, Kurten announced his intention to stand for UKIP leader following the resignation of Diane James after just 18 days. However, he withdrew from the contest and endorsed Paul Nuttall. Following the contest, Nuttall appointed Kurten as the party's education spokesperson on 30 November 2016.

At the 2017 general election Kurten stood in the Essex constituency of Castle Point, winning 5.3% of the vote, which was sufficient for him to retain his deposit. Kurten ran in the 2017 UKIP leadership election, where he came third, with Henry Bolton was elected as leader. Kurten stepped down from the UKIP frontbench on 22 January 2018 in protest at Bolton's refusal to stand down as leader after receiving a vote of no confidence from the party's national executive committee the previous day. He returned after Gerard Batten became leader on 14 April.

In the May 2018 local elections, Kurten unsuccessfully contested his local Sidcup ward in the London Borough of Bexley. He then stood as UKIP's candidate in the Lewisham East by-election on 14 June 2018, getting 1.7% of the vote. This by-election was mired in controversy, with left-wing activists disrupting a hustings event and abusing Kurten as he arrived; the meeting was stopped by police as Kurten began his speech. In December 2018, Kurten again resigned from the UKIP frontbench, this time on account of the anti-Islam direction of UKIP under the party's then-leader Gerard Batten, most significantly Batten's appointment of activist Tommy Robinson as an advisor on grooming gangs. On 12 December 2018, following Peter Whittle's departure from UKIP, he and Kurten disbanded the UKIP grouping on the London Assembly and formed the Brexit Alliance group, though Kurten remained a member of UKIP.

In December 2019, Kurten stood as the UKIP candidate in the constituency of Bognor Regis and Littlehampton in the 2019 general election after the new Brexit Party announced that it would not be contesting seats won by the Conservative Party at the 2017 general election. His vote share was 1.7%.

Heritage Party
In the London Assembly, he confronted Sadiq Khan on what he called "gender ideology" by promoting "traditional family values", and as a Brexit campaigner he opposed Khan's support for the EU and call for a second referendum.

In January 2020, Kurten announced he would run as an independent candidate in the upcoming London mayoral and London Assembly elections (then scheduled for May 2020, but both elections were postponed to 2021 due to the COVID-19 pandemic). Kurten founded a new political party in 2020: the Heritage Party was registered with the Electoral Commission that October. Kurten finished 15th with 11,025 votes in the mayoral election, while his party finished 13th on the London-wide list with 13,534 votes.

During the COVID-19 pandemic, Kurten spread COVID-19 misinformation by claiming that the disease was no worse than the flu. In December 2020, Kurten rejected a COVID-19 vaccine, for which he was denounced by the Conservative mayoral candidate Shaun Bailey, who saw this as irresponsible for an elected politician. Kurten has opposed lockdowns implemented in response to the COVID-19 pandemic, and he has attended protests against UK government policies.

The Heritage Party got 1.6% of the vote, coming fourth, in the 2021 Hartlepool by-election with 468 votes. In the 2021 London elections, Kurten received 0.4% of the vote in the mayoral election, coming fifteenth, while the Heritage party list, headed by Kurten, received 0.5% in the Assembly vote. He was, thus, not re-elected.

Kurten contested the 2021 Old Bexley and Sidcup by-election in December 2021. He was unsuccessful, getting only 0.5% of the vote in the election.

Electoral performance

House of Commons

UKIP

Heritage Party

London elections

References

External links

 

1971 births
Living people
Alumni of the University of St Andrews
Alumni of the University of Bath
Alumni of the University of Southampton
Black British politicians
British people of Jamaican descent
British political party founders
People from Littlehampton
Politicians from Sussex
UK Independence Party Members of the London Assembly
UK Independence Party parliamentary candidates
British Eurosceptics
Leaders of political parties in the United Kingdom